TOJam or Toronto Game Jam is an annual game development event held at George Brown College in Toronto, Canada each spring, usually the first weekend in May. The event is named for the common abbreviation for Toronto ("T.O."), and the term for an impromptu performance ("jam"), borrowed from jazz. The name of the event is knowingly evocative of "toe jam."  The first TOJam event was held in May 2006. Among the organizers/co-founders were Emilie McGinley, Jim McGinley, Rob Segal and Nelson Yu.

Event Structure 

TOJam is a live event that takes place over the course of a single weekend from Friday to Sunday, although some events have offered developers earlier access starting Thursday.   Participants are called "jammers" and come from a variety of backgrounds, including hobbyists, students, and professionals. They often participate at the event with their own equipment and supplies. Most attendees are adults, although some exceptions have been made for teenagers. Jammers enlist either solo or in teams. Some enlist as graphics or sound "floaters," lending their skills to a number of different teams, who sign up for their services on a waiting list. While the majority of participants attend the event in person, recent jams have accommodated virtual jammers, due to space limitations and geographical distance. Attendees are not limited to those from Toronto and have included Americans and Finnish participants.

Unlike other development events, TOJam is not a competition, but rather a period where game developers can focus their attention on a single project, with the goal of producing a finished, playable game by the end of the weekend. From the official kick-off Friday evening, jammers have 48 hours to complete their games before displaying them in an informal Sunday night showcase at the event's close.

The TOJam Arcade 

A follow up event, the TOJam Arcade, is scheduled a month or more after the main TOJam event. Unlike the Sunday night showcase that is mainly intended for the jammers themselves, this event is open to the public. Scheduling allows jammers to fine-tune their games before presenting them to consumers, rather than creators, and it's usually held at a bar or pub in downtown Toronto. 

At each Arcade event, attendees vote for their favorite games, which are awarded Gold, Silver, and Puce standards. These "winning" games receive priority placement on the TOJam website, even though the goal of the event is to facilitate completed games and to encourage unity across the Toronto game development community.

Required elements 

Each year, TOJammers are strongly encouraged to include a number of elements into their games. These elements have included:
 a splash screen indicating that the game was made at TOJam
 a recording of the TTC subway doors closing
 a picture of a goat on a pole, which may be rendered in a style of the developer's choosing

History 

When the Toronto Game Jam began, Toronto was not a recognized city for game development, as it was overshadowed by Vancouver and Montreal, where major studios like Electronic Arts and Ubisoft had settled. The event was first suggested by Nelson Yu, a developer-turned-writer, in the IGDA community boards as a way to get more local game development, in an attempt to retain talent. The first TOJam occurred in 2006.

Rivalry with the Nordic Game Jam 

TOJam carries on a good-natured rivalry with the Nordic Game Jam, with which it competes for attendance and output. This rivalry has not been officially acknowledged by the organizers of the Nordic Game Jam.

References

External links 
 Official site

Indie video games